Elysius rabusculum is a moth of the family Erebidae first described by Paul Dognin in 1905. It is found in Peru.

References

Moths described in 1905
rabusculum
Moths of South America